Bernard Keane is an Australian journalist for Crikey. He has been Crikey's political correspondent since 2008.

He is also the author of several books dealing with politics and related issues, including Surveillance (2015), War On The Internet, and A Short History Of Stupid (with Helen Razer).

Prior to his work with Crikey, Keane studied history at the University of Sydney, and then worked as a public servant and a speechwriter in transport and communications. In doing so he acted unceasingly to achieve his childhood ambition of bringing very fast train travel to the Australian people, without success.

References

Australian journalists
Living people
University of Sydney alumni
Year of birth missing (living people)